is a railway station in the city of Toyama, Toyama Prefecture, Japan, operated by the private railway operator Toyama Chihō Railway.

Lines
It is also the terminal station for Line 2 of the Toyama City Tram Line.

Station layout 
The station has one ground-level island platform serving the Fujikoshi Line and two ground-level opposed side platforms serving the Toyama City Tram Line, of which only one side is in operation. The station is staffed.

Platforms

History
It was renamed to its present name on 25 April 1921.

Adjacent stations

Passenger statistics
In fiscal 2015, the Toyama Chihō Railway portion of the station was used by 673 passengers daily.

Surrounding area 
Horikawa Junior High School

See also
 List of railway stations in Japan

References

External links

 

Railway stations in Toyama Prefecture
Railway stations in Japan opened in 1914
Stations of Toyama Chihō Railway